The Phæno Science Center is an interactive science center in Wolfsburg, Germany, completed in 2005.

The Phæno Science Center
Phæno arose from urban planning by the City of Wolfsburg.  In 1998 City officials were developing a plot of vacant, public land immediately adjacent to Wolfsburg's railway station and just south of VW's huge, then-unfinished attraction Autostadt. An art museum was planned for the site, but Dr. Wolfgang Guthardt, then the City's Director for Culture, Sports and Education, knew that such an institution would compete with Wolfsburg's successful Kunst Museum (Art Museum) and needed other options.  Guthardt visited Technorama, a science center in Switzerland and became convinced that a science center in Wolfsburg would complement both Autostadt and the Kunst Museum.

Preliminary planning began in November 1998, and one year later Joe Ansel, an American consultant and designer, was approached to handle the exhibitions and other operational aspects of the project. An architectural design competition was held in January 2000 and the prominent architect Zaha Hadid won, in conjunction with structural engineers, Adams Kara Taylor. About five years later, Phæno opened to the public on November 24, 2005 with over 250 interactive exhibits from Ansel Associates, Inc. all enclosed in an astounding concrete structure designed by Zaha Hadid, her German associate, Mayer Bährle architects and Adams Kara Taylor.  The architectural design has been described as a "hypnotic work of architecture - the kind of building that utterly transforms our vision of the future." The design won a 2006 RIBA European Award as well as the 2006 Institution of Structural Engineers Award for Arts, Leisure and Entertainment Structures.

The building stands on concrete stilts, allowing visitors to the Autostadt to pass through without interfering with the workings of the building. Phæno is connected to the Autostadt by a metal bridge accessed by escalators and stairs either side. The underside of Phæno and the "stilts" are illuminated.

Dr. Guthardt is now Phæno's first Executive Director. Phæno has enjoyed high attendance and broad public acceptance since its grand opening.  The Science Center has a theme song, "Phaenomenal," which was written and performed by American singer/songwriter Amanda Somerville for the opening.

The Phæno was included on a list of the 7 wonders of the Modern World (objects built since 2000) by The Financialist.

Movie appearances 
The Phaeno appears in the movie The International as headquarters of an Italian weapons company - digitally inserted in front to a cliff at the Iseo Lake.

The Phaeno also appears in the German disaster film / B-Movie Helden – Wenn dein Land dich braucht as a large hadron collider.

References

Further reading
Barbara Linz. Science Spaces: Architecture & Design. Cologne: Daab, 2007.
Philip Jodidio. Hadid: Zaha Hadid, Complete Works, 1979-2013. Köln: Taschen, 2013.
Greg Lynn (ed.). Christos Passas, Patrik Schumacher and Greg Lynn discuss Phaeno Science Center. Montreal, Canadian Centre for Architecture, 2017.

External links 

Zaha Hadid Architects
Finding aid for the Zaha Hadid Architects Phaeno Science Centre project records, Canadian Centre for Architecture
Architekturbüro Mayer-Bährle
Ansel Associates, Inc.
Science Center Celebrates an Industrial Cityscape - New York Times, November 28, 2005
Phaeno Science Center by transform

Zaha Hadid buildings
Science museums in Germany
Museums in Lower Saxony
Buildings and structures completed in 2005
Postmodern architecture
Modernist architecture in Germany
Event venues established in 2005
Buildings and structures in Wolfsburg
Science centers
Neo-futurism architecture